The United States Military Academy (USMA) is an undergraduate college in West Point, New York that educates and commissions officers for the United States Army. This list is drawn from alumni of the Military Academy who are engineers. Most of the U.S. Army's Chiefs of Engineers were Academy alumni; beginning with Joseph Gardner Swift (class of 1802) and most recently the current Chief of Engineers, Robert L. Van Antwerp, Jr. (class of 1972). Other notable engineers include Orlando Metcalfe Poe (class of 1856), a lighthouse engineer, and George Washington Goethals (class of 1880), chief engineer of the Panama Canal.



Engineers
Note: "Class year" refers to the class year of each alumnus, which usually is the same year the person graduated. However, in times of war, classes often graduate early.

References
General references

Inline citations

West Point
Academy alumni, famous list
United States Army officers
E
Lists of engineers